General  Robert Bruce (3 December 1821 – 1891) was a British Army officer who became colonel of the Queen's Royal Regiment (West Surrey).

Military career
Bruce was commissioned as an ensign in the 74th (Highland) Regiment of Foot on 9 June 1838. He saw action with his regiment in the 8th Xhosa War between 1851 and 1853. He became commanding officer of the 2nd battalion of his regiment in August 1857 in which capacity he was deployed to Gibraltar. He went on to become commander of the troops in the North British District in 1878. He became colonel of the East Yorkshire Regiment on 4 February 1890 and colonel of the  Queen's Royal Regiment (West Surrey) on 6 June 1891.

References

 

|-

1821 births
1891 deaths
British Army generals